Carolyn House  (born August 23, 1945) is an American former competition swimmer and former world record-holder in two events.  At the age of 15, she competed in the preliminary heats of the 400-meter freestyle at the 1960 Summer Olympics in Rome, clocking a time of 5:00.7.

During a ten-day span in August 1962, she broke the world records in both the 800-meter and 1,500-meter freestyle events.  On August 16, 1962, she set a new world record of 9:51.6 in the 800-meter freestyle,  On August 26, 1962, she established a new world mark of 18:44.0 for the 1,500-meter freestyle, cutting 18.8 seconds off the old mark.  Both records would survive until July 1964, almost two years later.

See also
 World record progression 800 metres freestyle
 World record progression 1500 metres freestyle

References

1945 births
Living people
American female freestyle swimmers
World record setters in swimming
Olympic swimmers of the United States
Swimmers from Los Angeles
Swimmers at the 1960 Summer Olympics
21st-century American women